Green Lantern: Rise of the Manhunters is an action video game, the first based on DC Comics' Green Lantern (Hal Jordan).  The game is a tie-in/sequel to the film Green Lantern, which opened in theaters on June 17, 2011. The game features 3D visuals on the Nintendo 3DS, PlayStation 3 and Xbox 360, providing TriOviz Inficolor 3D for standard televisions and stereoscopic 3D for dedicated 3DTVs.

Gameplay
Green Lantern: Rise of the Manhunters offers three different game modes. The player takes control of Hal Jordan and the power of his Green Lantern ring is at the player's disposal, in which weapons and objects can be created to defeat enemies and progress through levels. Most versions of the game provide a mix of on-foot beat 'em up battles and flying rail shooter sequences. The on-foot levels in the non-Nintendo versions allow for full 3-D movement from fixed camera perspectives, but are presented in 2.5D in the Nintendo versions. The non-Nintendo versions also support drop-in, drop-out cooperative multiplayer, in which a second player takes control of Sinestro. The Wii version can be played with either the Wii Remote and Nunchuk, or the Classic Controller.

Synopsis
The Manhunters are an android race, originally created by the Guardians of the Universe to serve as the first interstellar police force. The Manhunters became more obsessed with administering punishment than serving justice, forcing the Guardians to dissolve their ranks. The few Manhunters that survived fled into exile and the Guardians founded a new elite police force called the Green Lantern Corps and armed its members with specially crafted power rings. Now the Manhunters are back and out for revenge, readying their forces for a war against the Guardians and the Green Lantern Corps. Faced with destruction, the Corps is looking to gifted but cocky test pilot Hal Jordan as the newest recruit, to protect peace and preserve justice.

Plot
The game begins with Hal Jordan, Kilowog, and Sinestro attending Abin Sur's funeral on Oa. When Oa is attacked by the Manhunters, the three defend the power battery and repel the invasion. They then pick up a distress call from Queen Aga'po on the planet Zamaron. While Kilowog goes to Biot, the Manhunters' home world, Sinestro and Hal go to Zamaron to aid Aga'po. While on Zamaron, Sinestro and Hal learn about the Willhunters, a Manhunter-developed weapon which Mind controls its victims. After Sinestro and Hal are separated, Hal frees the captive Aga'Po, learning that she has already been exposed to a Willhunter and is under the Manhunters' permanent control. Hal then frees Aga'po. Hal and Sinestro then go to Biot, where, after reuniting with Kilowog, they defeat the Highmaster, leader of the Manhunters. The three then go back to Oa and encounter Amon Sur, Abin Sur's son who believes that he should have his father's ring and it is revealed that he betrayed the Green Lantern Corps to the Manhunters and engineered the invasion of Oa. Hal then defeats Amon on Oa and Amon is arrested as Hal is honored for his dedication.

Development
Building on the anticipation of the feature film Green Lantern, the non-Nintendo versions of Green Lantern: Rise of the Manhunters include the likeness and voice talent of Ryan Reynolds as Hal Jordan, who is the star of the film. Radio commentator and voice actor Michael Jackson reprised his role as Ganthet for the same versions from the animated film Green Lantern: Emerald Knights, a direct-to-video project that was timed for release of the live-action Green Lantern film. There is no voice acting for the Nintendo versions.

Reception
Green Lantern: Rise of the Manhunters received mixed reviews. IGN, Gamespot and G4's X-Play granted a 60% score for the non-Nintendo versions (6.0 out of 10 and 3 stars out of 5), with IGN deeming the non-Nintendo versions to be slightly superior over the Nintendo versions, giving the Wii and DS versions a 5.5 out of 10 and the 3DS version a 4.5 out of 10.

Mobile version
An Apple iOS version was released in the same time as the console release. It plays like a rail shooter unlike the console releases and was developed by Other Ocean Software.

References

External links
 

2011 video games
IOS games
Nintendo DS games
Nintendo 3DS games
PlayStation 3 games
Video games based on DC Comics
Science fiction video games
Video games developed in the United States
Video games with stereoscopic 3D graphics
Wii games
Xbox 360 games
Green Lantern in other media
Warner Bros. video games
Griptonite Games
Double Helix Games games
Video games based on films
Video games based on adaptations
Superhero video games
Video games about police officers
Video games set on fictional planets